Borj-e Cheshmeh-ye Mahmud (also Romanized as Borj-e Cheshmeh-ye Maḩmūd, Borj-e Chashmeh Maḩmūd, and Borj-e Cheshmeh Maḩmūd; also known as Borj, Borj-e Lah, and Burj) is a village in Astaneh Rural District, in the Central District of Shazand County, Markazi Province, Iran. At the 2006 census, its population was 134, in 28 families.

References 

Populated places in Shazand County